Qaid is a 1975 Hindi thriller drama film produced and directed by Atma Ram. The film stars Vinod Khanna, Leena Chandavarkar, Kamini Kaushal, Nazir Hussain, Mehmood, Keshto Mukherjee and K. N. Singh.

Plot
The movie revolves with the life of an orphan girl of a millionaire. She works as maidservant in the house of Advocate Jai Saxena. Suddenly she informs the advocate that someone is trying to kill her and her family and friends can not recognise her. Jai wants to give her shelter. Next day police arrives there and tell that this woman's real name is Ragini, a killer.

Cast
 Vinod Khanna as Advocate Jai Saxena
 Leena Chandavarkar as Preet
 Jayshree T. as Julie
 Mehmood as Bajrangi
 Kamini Kaushal as Mrs. Saxena
 Nazir Hussain as Rai Bahadur Tulsinath
 Keshto Mukherjee as Kanhaiyalal
 Satyendra Kapoor as Inspector L.G. Kaushik
 K. N. Singh as Dr. Trivedi
 Sajjan as Mr. Verma
 Rajesh Behl as Rakesh
 Mridula Rani as Sarita's Mother
 Sameer Khan as  Heera

Soundtrack 
All songs were composed by Nitin–Mangesh and written by Maya Govind.

"Deewana Hoon Pyaar Ka" - Kishore Kumar 
"Yeh Dil De De De Yeh Jaan Le Le" - Amit Kumar, Anjali
"Beliya Aale Beliya" - Asha Bhosle, Nitin Mukesh 
"Ye To Zindagi Hai" - Kishore Kumar, Nitin Mukesh
"Yahan Kaun Hai Asli Kaun Hai Nakli" - Lata Mangeshkar
"Karale Saaf Karale Zara Tu Saaf Karale" - Usha Mangeshkar, Mehmood
"Kaali Raat Aai Nahi" - Anjali Ram

References

External links 
 

1975 films
1970s Hindi-language films
Indian thriller drama films
Films scored by Nitin–Mangesh